Biruaca is a city in Apure State in Venezuela. Biruaca is the shire town of Biruaca Municipality.

Cities in Apure